2018–19 Albanian Cup was the sixty-seventh season of Albania's annual cup competition. Skënderbeu are the defending champions. Kukësi won the title for the second time in their history.

Format
Ties are played in a two-legged format similar to those of European competitions. If the aggregate score is tied after both games, the team with the higher number of away goals advances. If the number of away goals is equal in both games, the match is decided by extra time and a penalty shoot-out, if necessary.

Preliminary round
In order to reduce the number of participating teams for the first round to 32, a preliminary tournament is played. In contrast to the main tournament, the preliminary tournament is held as a single-leg knock-out competition. Matches were played on 2 September 2018 and involved the four best teams from the Albanian Second Division.

|-

|}

First round
All 30 teams of the 2018–19 Kategoria Superiore and Kategoria e Parë entered in this round along with the two qualifiers from the preliminary round. The first legs were played on 12 September 2018 and the second legs took place on 26 September 2018.

|}

Skënderbeu advanced to the second round.

Luftëtari advanced to the second round.

Partizani advanced to the second round.

Kamza advanced to the second round.

Vllaznia advanced to the second round.

Kastrioti advanced to the second round.

Egnatia advanced to the second round.

Besëlidhja advanced to the second round.

Kukësi advanced to the second round.

Laçi advanced to the second round.

Flamurtari advanced to the second round.

Teuta advanced to the second round.

Lushnja advanced to the second round.

Tirana advanced to the second round.

Bylis advanced to the second round.

Apolonia advanced to the second round.

Second round
All  the 16 qualified teams from the first round progressed to the second round. The first legs were played on 22 and 23 January 2019 and the second legs took place on 6 February 2019.

|}

Skënderbeu advanced to the quarter finals.

Luftëtari advanced to the quarter finals.

Partizani advanced to the quarter finals.

Kamza advanced to the quarter finals.

Kukësi advanced to the quarter finals.

Laçi advanced to the quarter finals.

Tirana advanced to the quarter finals.

Teuta advanced to the quarter finals.

Quarter-finals
All eight qualified teams from the second round progressed to the quarter-finals. The first legs were played on 12 and 13 March 2019 and the second legs took place on 3 April 2019. Skënderbeu automatically qualified to the semi-finals after Kamza was banned from football competitions for the remaining of the season.

|}

Luftëtari advanced to the semi finals.

Kukësi advanced to the semi finals.

Tirana advanced to the semi finals.

Semi-finals
The first legs were played on 24 April and the second legs were played on 8 May 2019.

|}

Kukësi advanced to the final.

Tirana advanced to the final.

Final

References

http://www.panorama.com.al/sport/kupa-e-shqiperise-starton-kete-fundjave-njihuni-me-2-perballjet-e-para/ (in Albanian)
http://fshf.org/sq/kupa-e-shqiperise-ja-datat-turet-dhe-ciftet-sipas-skemes-perkatese/ (in Albanian)

Cup
Albanian Cup seasons
Albanian Cup